Mićo Brković (born 1 March 1968) is a Yugoslav former cyclist. He competed at the 1988 Summer Olympics for Yugoslavia and the 1992 Summer Olympics as an Independent Olympic Participant.

References

External links
 

1968 births
Living people
Serbian male cyclists
Yugoslav male cyclists
Olympic cyclists of Yugoslavia
Olympic cyclists as Independent Olympic Participants
Cyclists at the 1988 Summer Olympics
Cyclists at the 1992 Summer Olympics
Place of birth missing (living people)